The 2020 Washington House of Representatives elections took place as part of the biennial United States elections on November 3, 2020. Washington state voters elected state representatives in all 98 seats of the House, electing 2 state representatives in each of the 49 Washington state legislative districts. State representatives serve two-year terms in the Washington House of Representatives.

Following the previous election in 2018, Democrats held a 57-to-41 seat majority over Republicans.

Democrats retained control of the Washington House of Representatives following the 2020 general election, with the balance of power remaining unchanged at 57 (D) to 41 (R).

Only one district, the 10th, elected its two representatives from different parties.

Predictions

Overview

Summary of Results by House District
The election resulted in Democratic Party members winning 57 seats and Republican Party members winning 41 seats, with no net change since the last election. Representatives Brian Blake (D) and Luanne Van Werven (R) lost reelection.

Source:

Detailed Results by House District

Note: Washington uses a top two primary system. Official primary results can be obtained here and official general election results here.

District 1

District 2

District 3

District 4

District 5

District 6

District 7

District 8

District 9

District 10

District 11

District 12

District 13

District 14

District 15

District 16

District 17

District 18

District 19

District 20

District 21

District 22

District 23

District 24

District 25

District 26

District 27

District 28

District 29

District 30

District 31

District 32

District 33

District 34

District 35

District 36

District 37

District 38

District 39

District 40

District 41

District 42

District 43

District 44

District 45

District 46

District 47

District 48

District 49

See also
2020 Washington elections
2020 Washington State Senate election
2020 Washington gubernatorial election
2020 Washington lieutenant gubernatorial election
2020 United States presidential election in Washington (state)
2020 United States House of Representatives elections in Washington

References

External links
 
 
  (State affiliate of the U.S. League of Women Voters)
 

Washington House
House of Representatives
Washington House of Representatives elections